Asterolasia muricata, commonly known as lemon star-bush, is a species of small, slender, erect shrub that is endemic to South Australia. It has leathery leaves covered with rough points and with the edges rolled under, and yellow flowers arranged singly or in groups of up to three, with woolly star-shaped hairs on the back of the petals.

Description
The upper surface of the leaves is covered with rough points but the lower surface is covered with woolly, star-shaped hairs. There are ten stamens

Taxonomy
Asterolasia muricata was first described in 1912 by John McConnell Black who published the description in Transactions and Proceedings of the Royal Society of South Australia.

Distribution and habitat
Asterolasia muricata grows in sandy heath and is found on Kangaroo Island and on the southern tip of the Fleurieu Peninsula in South Australia.

References

muricata
Sapindales of Australia
Flora of South Australia
Plants described in 1912
Taxa named by John McConnell Black